Vicente Samuel Saldívar García (May 3, 1943 – July 18, 1985) was a Mexican professional boxer who competed between 1971 and 1973. He was a two-time featherweight champion, having held the WBA, WBC, and The Ring titles from 1964 until his retirement in 1967. He came back and once again held the WBC and The Ring titles in 1970. Saldivar has frequently been ranked amongst the greatest in the history of that division by many noted boxing historians and critics. He currently holds the record for the most wins in unified featherweight title bouts and the longest unified featherweight championship reign in boxing history at 8 title bouts and 7 title defenses respectively. Saldívar fought in front of the fourth largest crowd ever, 90,000 in Estadio Azteca, and has also regularly been cited as one of the finest left-handed fighters of all time.

Childhood

Saldívar was born in one of the many poor quarters of Mexico City and is one of seven children. He used to get in fights on the streets and in school, so his father decided to channel the misguided energy into boxing. Like many other Mexicans his father was a big boxing fan, so it was a logical move. He was taught by Jose Moreno, a veteran trainer of a nearby Mexico City boxing gym.

Fighting style

As a southpaw, Saldívar was a dynamic fighter in the ring. He could box or brawl, and often softened opponents with a brutal body attack. Among his greatest assets was his stamina; he scored seven knockouts after the 7th round. Saldívar had an unusually slow heart and pulse rate, which he claimed was the secret of the phenomenal pace he was able to maintain in the ring.

Amateur career

Saldívar had a successful amateur career, crowned with a Mexican Golden Gloves title at bantamweight. At seventeen years old, he was included into the 1960 Olympic team, but was eliminated in the first bout of the Rome tournament by Ernst Chervet of Switzerland.

Professional career

Saldívar turned professional in 1961 and won the Mexican featherweight title with a second-round knockout of Juan Ramírez on February 8, 1964.  His first major victory came on June 1 of that same year when he defeated future lightweight champion and hall of fame member Ismael Laguna. Before challenging for a world title, he accumulated a record of 25–1, with his sole loss avenged by knockout.

WBC and WBA Featherweight Championships
On September 26, 1964, Saldívar won the WBA and WBC Featherweight titles by upsetting fellow Mexican fighter and future hall of famer Sugar Ramos with an 11th-round knockout in an extremely bloody battle. His first reign as champion would last three years, in which Saldívar made eight successful title defenses. The reign was highlighted by his trilogy with Howard Winstone.

In his first title defense, he defeated future champion Raul Rojas. On September 7, 1965, he defeated Winstone in their first meeting with a 15-round decision . Following that victory, he defeated Floyd Robertson by second round knock out. He then defeated Mitsunori Seki in two consecutive bouts. On June 15, 1967, Saldívar defeated Winston once again by a 15-round decision. In 1996, Ring magazine included their second meeting on their list of the 100 greatest title fights of all-time. In the final installment of their trilogy, he defeated Winston by 12th round knock out. Saldivar announced his retirement after that contest in October 1967. Three months later, Winstone won recognition as WBC featherweight champion, claiming the belt left vacant by Saldivar, by defeating Mitsunori Seki with a 9th-round stoppage due to a cut right eye.

Return to the ring
After 21 months of inactivity, Saldívar returned to the ring on July 18, 1969 and won a 10-round unanimous decision over another former as well as future Featherweight champion, José Legra. Then on May 9, 1970, he regained the featherweight title with a 15-round unanimous decision over Johnny Famechon. This reign, however, was short-lived. Saldívar lost the crown seven months later in his first defense against Kuniaki Shibata.

Retirement and comeback
He would fight once more before retiring again in 1971, however, the lure of the ring was too strong. He returned at the age of 30 after 2 years and 3 months of inactivity for another title attempt on October 21, 1973. His opponent was fellow Hall of Famer and former bantamweight champion Éder Jofre. Jofre, who was 37, had won the Featherweight crown after coming out of his own retirement (albeit a brief 7 month one). Saldívar's skills had greatly diminished and Jofre won the contest with a fourth-round knockout in Brazil. After the fight, Saldívar retired for good.

Professional boxing record

Death
He died of cancer on July 18, 1985, aged only 42. In 1999 he was inducted into the International Boxing Hall of Fame.

See also
Lineal championship
List of WBC world champions
List of WBA world champions
List of Featherweight boxing champions
List of Mexican boxing world champions
List of undisputed world boxing champions

References

External links

|-

|-

|-

|-

|-

|-

Boxers from Mexico City
Boxers at the 1960 Summer Olympics
Olympic boxers of Mexico
World boxing champions
World Boxing Council champions
World Boxing Association champions
World featherweight boxing champions
1943 births
1985 deaths
Deaths from cancer in Mexico
Mexican male boxers
International Boxing Hall of Fame inductees